The men's 100 metres at the 2015 World Championships in Athletics was held at the Beijing National Stadium on 22 and 23 August.

Summary
Justin Gatlin had the world leading time in 2015. Gatlin ran 9.83 s in the heats and 9.77 s in the semi-final. Reigning champion Usain Bolt ran times of 9.96 s in both rounds. Jimmy Vicaut and Su Bingtian qualified for the final with tied fastest loser times of 9.986 s, so there were 9 competitors in the final.

In the final, Bolt finished one hundredth of a second ahead of Gatlin in a time of 9.79 s.	
There was a tie for third place, with Andre De Grasse and Trayvon Bromell both finishing in 9.911 s, and two bronze medals were awarded.

At 39 years, 139 days old, Kim Collins became the oldest ever competitor for the men's 100 m.

Records
Prior to the competition, the records were as follows:

Qualification standards

Schedule

Results

Preliminary round
Qualification: Best 3 (Q) and next 3 fastest (q) qualify for the next round.

Wind:

Heat 1: -0.8 m/s, Heat 2: -0.3 m/s, Heat 3: -0.6 m/s

Heats
Qualification: Best 3 (Q) and next 3 fastest (q) qualify for the next round.

Wind:

Heat 1: −0.1 m/s, Heat 2: −1.4 m/s, Heat 3: −0.3 m/s, Heat 4: +0.5 m/s, Heat 5: +0.3 m/s, Heat 6: +2.1 m/s, Heat 7: −0.2 m/s

Semifinals
Qualification: Best 2 (Q) and next 2 fastest (q) qualify for the final.

Wind:

Heat 1: −0.4 m/s, Heat 2: +0.9 m/s, Heat 3: −0.4 m/s

Final
The final was started at 21:15.

Wind: −0.5 m/s

References

100
100 metres at the World Athletics Championships